David Sant (born 1968) is a Spanish mime artist, acrobat, puppeteer, stuntman, director, actor and writer.

Early life and career 
Sant was born in Spain in 1968. He discovered the theatre at the age of seventeen thanks to his literature teacher.

He moved to the UK in the early nineties where he began performing as a mime artist, acrobat, puppeteer, stuntman and directed for many physical theatre companies winning several awards at different international festivals. In 2006, he was approached by the BBC to bring his comedy skills to television and has been directing sitcoms and comedy dramas ever since.

Sant is best known for the role of Cartoon Head from series two of the British television show Ideal and is also known for playing the title role and the other male characters in the season 5–6 revival of Pingu, replacing Carlo Bonomi.

He has directed many television series including Jonathan Creek, Benidorm and Stella.

He has also appeared in theatrical roles, including Mindbender, presented by the theatre company Peepolykus, and All in the Timing by David Ives, also presented by Peepolykus.

Filmography

Director/Writer 
Pinga in a Box (2005)
Fast Forward (1991)
My Spy Family
Not Waving (2005)
The Golf War (2007)
Living with Two People You Like Individually... But Not as a Couple (2007)
Comedy Cuts (2007)
Coming of Age (2007–8)
The Gym (2008)
Scallywagga (2010)

Acting credits 
My Family (2003) – Restaurant Waiter
Pingu  (2003–06) – Pingu, various characters (voice)
Doctor Who (2005) – Auton
Ideal (2005–11) – Cartoon Head, Enrique
Columbus: The Lost Voyage (2007) – Bartolome Columbus
Time Trumpet (2006) – Himself
Comic Relief 2007: The Big One (2007) – Himself

References

External links 

TV.com listing
All In The Timing by David Ives

1968 births
Living people
People from Catalonia
British people of Catalan descent
Spanish emigrants to the United Kingdom
English male television actors
21st-century English male actors
20th-century English male actors